Wang Shouqian (born 4 February 1997), known as Charles Wang in the west, is a Chinese professional golfer. In December 2015 at age 18, Wang qualified for the Web.com Tour through Q School. He had survived all three previous stages of Q School, and was the youngest player in the field at the final stage.

Wang was born in Beijing. At the age of six, he participated in his first junior tournament. In 2010, he came to the United States to attend Sarasota Christian School. He won the IMG Leadbetter Junior Championship in 2011.

Wang attended Northwestern University for the 2014–15 academic year and played on the golf team. He turned pro in the spring of 2015.

Wang is an accomplished violinist.

References 

Chinese male golfers
Northwestern Wildcats men's golfers
Sportspeople from Beijing
1997 births
Living people
21st-century Chinese people
20th-century Chinese people